MicroIllusions, based in Granada Hills, California was a computer game developer and publisher of the home computer era (late 1980s to early 1990s).  MicroIllusions, as a company, was a strong supporter of the Amiga and typically released titles on that platform before porting it to others.  Activision cancelled them as an affiliated publisher after a year of signing them up. The company went out of business in or about 1990.

General
The company impact has been summed up as, "During MicroIllusion’s brief existence they produced some visionary software that, like so much else that came out of the Amiga scene, gave the world an imperfect glimpse of its multimedia future. That’s as true of Photon Paint, the progenitor of photographic-quality visual editors like Adobe Photoshop, as it is of Music-X, a forerunner of easy-to-use music packages like GarageBand."

Founding

According to The Digital Antiquarian, "The seeds of MicroIllusions were planted during one day’s idle conversation when Steinert complained to David Joiner that, while the Amiga supposedly had speech synthesis built into its operating system, he had never actually heard his machines talk; .. He proved as good as his word within a few hours. Impressed, Steinert asked if he could sell the new program ' talk to me' in his store for a straight 50/50 split. Given his circumstances, Joiner was hardly in a position to quibble. When the program sold well, Steinert decided to get into Amiga software development in earnest with the help of his wunderkind."

Applications
Photon Paint 1.0 (2D painting with 3D generation) (1987) Amiga
Photon Video: Cel Animator (animation) (1988) Amiga
Transport Controller (animation) (1988) Amiga
Photon Paint 2.0 (2D painting with 3D generation) (1989) Amiga / Mac
Edit Decision List Processor (film/video production) (1989) Amiga
Genesis: The Third Day (3D landscape generation) (1991) Amiga
Music-X (1989) David Joiner (Talin)
Music-X Jr
Dynamic CAD 2.3
Dynamic Word
The Planetarium
Micro Midi
Dynamic Publisher

Games
 Discovery (1986), Amiga, DOS, C64, Megadrive (Genesis) created by David Joiner (Talin). Various addons were released ( language, Math, Science, Social Studies, Spell, Trivia 1)
 Faery Tale Adventure, (1986) Amiga, created by David Joiner (Talin) 
 Blackjack Academy (1987), Amiga, DOS, Apple IIGS created by Westwood
 Ebonstar (1988), Amiga, created by the Dreamers Guild
 Romantic Encounters at the Dome (1988) Amiga, DOS, Macintosh
 Faery Tale Adventure (1987) Amiga and Commodore 64 (C64), DOS, Sega Mega Drive
 Galactic Invasion (1987) Amiga. Developed by Silent Software.
 Tracers (1988) Developed by Hacker Corp. Amiga
 Fire Power (1988) Amiga, C64, Apple IIGS, DOS
 Mainframe (1988) C64
Craps Academy (1988) Europe-only release, Amiga Developed by Silent Software.
Questmaster 1: Prism of Heheutotol (a.k.a. Dondra: A New Beginning) (1988) C64, DOS (Apple II version by Spectrum Holobyte)
 Turbo (1989) Developed by Silent Software. Amiga
Laser Squad (published, 1989) Developed by Blade (Teque) Amiga, Amstrad CPC, Atari ST, Commodore 64, MS-DOS, ZX Spectrum, MSX 1/2, NEC PC-98
 Dr. Plummet's House of Flux (1989)
 Jetsons George Jetson and the Legend of Robotopia (1989), Amiga, Apple Mac. Developed by The Dreamers Guild
 Land Of Legends, Unreleased, Developed by Parsec Soft Systems.

Faery Tale Adventure II: Halls of the Dead (1997), sometimes credited to MicroIllusions, was completed by The Dreamers Guild, Inc. for various platforms.

References

External links
 MicroIllusions profile from MobyGames

Defunct companies based in California
Defunct video game companies of the United States
Video game development companies
Video game publishers